is a Japanese football player. He plays for Tochigi City, on loan from Matsumoto Yamaga FC.

Playing career
Akira Toshima joined to JEF United Chiba in 2010. In August 2013, he moved to Fujieda MYFC. In 2014, he backed to JEF United Chiba. In 2015, he moved to FC Machida Zelvia.

Club statistics
Updated to 23 February 2018.

References

External links
Profile at Yokohama FC
Profile at Machida Zelvia

1991 births
Living people
Association football people from Miyagi Prefecture
Japanese footballers
J2 League players
J3 League players
Japan Football League players
JEF United Chiba players
Fujieda MYFC players
FC Machida Zelvia players
Yokohama FC players
Omiya Ardija players
Matsumoto Yamaga FC players
Tochigi City FC players
Association football forwards